This is a list of LGBT bookstores. The bookstores listed are brick and mortar stores with a focus on the LGBT community and literature.

LGBT bookstores

Europe
 Les Mots à la bouche, Paris, France
 Librairie Vigna, Nice, France
 Libreria Antigone, Milan, Italy
 Buchhandlung Löwenherz, Vienna, Austria
 PAGE 28, Malmö, Sweden
 Libreria Berkana, Madrid, Spain
 Libreria Complices, Barcelona, Spain
 Antinous, Barcelona, Spain
 Boekwinkel Savannah Bay, Utrecht, the Netherlands
 Prinz Eisenherz Buchladen, Berlin, Germany
 Buchladen Erlkönig, Stuttgart, Germany
 Livraria aberta, Porto, Portugal

UK

 Category Is Books, Glasgow, Scotland
 Common Press, London, England
 Gay's the Word Bookshop, London, England
 Paned o Gê, Cardiff, Wales 
 Shelf Life, Cardiff, Wales
 Proud Geek, Birmingham, England
 Queer Lit, Manchester, England
 The Bookish Type, Leeds, England
 The Portal Bookshop, York, England
 Lighthouse- Edinburgh's Radical Bookshop, Edinburgh, Scotland

USA
 Antigone Books, Tucson, Arizona
 Charis Books & More, Decatur, Georgia
Unabridged Bookstore, Chicago, Illinois
 Women & Children First, Chicago
 Firestorm Books & Coffee, Asheville, North Carolina
 Bureau of General Services—Queer Division (Hosted by The LGBT Community Center), New York
 Philly AIDS Thrift at Giovanni's Room Bookstore, Philadelphia
 Book Woman, Austin, Texas
 The Little Gay Shop, Austin Texas (A marketplace for queer artists and creators with great rare and collectible books and magazines)
 A Room of One's Own Bookstore, Madison, Wisconsin
 Outwords Books, Gifts & Coffee, Milwaukee
 Fabulosa Books (formerly Dog-Eared Books Castro), San Francisco
 Little District Books, Washington, DC

Elsewhere
 Glad Day Bookshop, Toronto, Canada
 Little Sister's Book and Art Emporium, Vancouver, Canada
 Spartacus Books, Vancouver, Canada
 Voces en Tinta, Zona Rosa, Mexico City
 El Armario Abierto, Mexico City
 GinGin Store, Taipei, Taiwan
 Fembooks (女書店) Taipei, Taiwan
 Hares & Hyenas, Melbourne, Australia
 The Bookshop, Darlinghurst, Sydney, Australia

Closed bookstores 
After Stonewall, Ottawa, Canada (still open, but no longer primarily a bookstore)
Amazon. True Colors Bookstore, Minneapolis
Back To Brum, Birmingham, England
A Brother's Touch Bookstore, Minneapolis
Boekhandel de Feeks, Nijmegen, the Netherlands
Buchladen Männerschwarm, Hamburg, Germany
Der Andere Buchladen, Mannheim, Germany
Decatur Street Bookshop, New Orleans
Calamus, Boston
A Different Light Bookstore, Los Angeles, New York, San Francisco
Dreams and Swords, Indianapolis, Indiana
 Faubourg Marigny Art and Books, New Orleans
Lavender Menace Bookshop, Edinburgh, Scotland
Librairie L'Androgyne, Montreal, Quebec, Canada
Libreria Babele, Milan, Italy
Libreria Nuestras Letras, San José, Costa Rica
Lobo Book Shop, Dallas, Texas
Lobo Book Shop, Austin, Texas
Lobo Book Shop, Oklahoma City
Lobo Bookshop Cafe, Houston, Texas
Love That Dares, San Francisco
Lambda Rising Bookstore, Washington, D.C.
Old Wives Tales, San Francisco
Oscar Wilde Bookshop, New York City
Outloud Bookstore, Nashville, Tennessee
Outwrite Bookstore & Coffeehouse, Atlanta, Georgia, US
Otras Letras, Buenos Aires
Query Books, Minneapolis
Sisters and Brothers, Albuquerque, New Mexico, US
Vrolijk Boeken & Films, Amsterdam
Wild Iris Books, Gainesville, Florida
Common Language Bookstore, Ann Arbor, Michigan
 Esquina cor-de-rosa, Lisboa, Portugal
Walt Whitman Bookshop, San Francisco

References

Further reading
GLBTQ Bookstores, American Library Association

Lists of bookstores
Bookstores